Neorxnawang (also Neorxenawang and Neorxnawong) is an Old English noun used to translate the Christian concept of paradise in Anglo-Saxon literature. Scholars propose that the noun originally derives from Germanic mythology, referring to a "heavenly meadow" or place without toil or worries.

Etymology
While the second half of the word, -wang, is widely acknowledged to mean 'field' and its cognate waggs appears for 'paradise' in Gothic, scholars have come to no agreement on the meaning of the first element of the word, though at least a dozen attempts have been made to interpret it by scholars. Scholar Rudolf Simek states that it is possible to consider the term as a Proto-Germanic term for 'Asgard' or 'Other World' due to the noun's unclear meaning, that Christian authors who used it seemed to have a poor understanding of it as well, and that it corresponds with the North Germanic terms Iðavöllr (possibly 'field of activity' or 'the continually renewing, rejuvenating field') and Glæsisvellir ('the shining fields').

19th century scholar Jacob Grimm observes that etymological connections have been proposed between Norn and Neorxnawang, but says that the theory raises etymological issues and other problems: "The A. gen. pl. neorxana, which only occurs in 'neorxena wong' = paradisus, has been proposed, but the abbreviation would be something unheard of, and even the nom. sing. neorxe or neorxu at variance with norn; besides,the Parcae are nowhere found connected with paradise."

Late 19th and early 20th century philologist James Bright proposes that neorxena- derives from the phrase ne wyrcan, meaning 'no working'.

In a 1985 paper, Jane Roberts expounds her interpretation of nēo-rixena as "corpse-rushes". 

The form ēarixena appears in Leechdom iii Ad Strictum Pectus. Sive ad Asthmaticos (redated to 1100): "Nim þanne ēarixena wyrtruman …" (Take then rhisomes of water-rushes …). The unstressed i and e have disappeared through syncope; the initial n is due to provection (juncture loss) in e.g. "on ēarxna wange". Eorxnawang is thus a loan translation of Campi Cyperorum and Sechet-Aaru, both meaning Field of Rushes. 

In a 2012 paper, Joseph S. Hopkins and Haukur Þorgeirsson propose a connection between Old Norse Fólkvangr, an afterlife location overseen by the goddess Freyja, and a variety of other Germanic words referring to the afterlife that contain extensions of Proto-Germanic *wangaz (including Old English Neorxnawang and Gothic waggs), potentially stemming from a concept of a '*wangaz of the dead' in Proto-Germanic mythology.

See also
 Muspilli, an Old High German poem where pagan vocabulary and Christian concepts mingle
 Þrúðvangr, the field of the god Thor

Notes

References

 Bright, James Wilson. 1913. An Anglo-Saxon Reader. Henry Holt and Company.
 Grimm, Jacob. 1882. James Steven Stallybrass trans. Teutonic Mythology: Translated from the Fourth Edition with Notes and Appendix Vol. I. London: George Bell and Sons.
 Hopkins, Joseph S. and Haukur Þorgeirsson. 2012. "The Ship in the Field". RMN Newsletter 3, 2011:14-18. University of Helsinki.
 Jeep, John. 2005. Medieval Germany: An Encyclopedia. Routledge. 
 McKinnell, John. 2005. Meeting the Other in Norse Myth and Legend. D.S. Brewer 
 Roberts, J. 1985. "A Preliminary "Heaven" Index for Old English". University of Leeds.
 Simek, Rudolf. 2007. Angela Hall trans. Dictionary of Northern Mythology. D.S. Brewer. 

Afterlife places
Anglo-Saxon paganism
Germanic mythology
Old English